Lincolnshire Poacher is a hard unpasteurised cow's milk cheese that is generally of a cylindrical shape with a rind resembling granite in appearance. It is made at Ulceby Grange Farm, Alford, in Lincolnshire, England, by craft cheesemaker Richard Tagg. The cheese is matured for between 14 and 24 months, depending on when the milk was collected.

Awards
 Supreme Champion at the 1996/7 British Cheese Awards
 Best British Cheese at the World Cheese Awards in 2001/2
 Gold Medals at the British Cheese Awards 2003/4 for both Lincolnshire Poacher and Smoked Lincolnshire Poacher

See also

 The Lincolnshire Poacher
 List of smoked foods

References

External links

Local tourist site describes the cheese

English cheeses
Cow's-milk cheeses
Lincolnshire cuisine
Smoked cheeses